Wincham Park is a football stadium in Wincham, a parish on the edge of Northwich, England. The home ground of Witton Albion, it first opened in 1989, after the club left their former Central Ground. Capacity is 4,813, with 600 covered seats on the north side of the stadium. The other three sides of the ground are all standing: the Lostock End, Wincham End, and Popular Side.

Wincham Park has not changed much since its construction although cover was added at both ends of the stadium in 1990. The floodlights were replaced in 2010 after supporters walked to nearby Runcorn to raise the funds. The record attendance for a match at Wincham Park was when Northwich Victoria lost 2–0 to Shrewsbury Town on 1 January 2004 in The Football Conference. A crowd of 3,268 (2,609 away) attended the game.

The stadium has had a number of names due to sponsorship deals; these include Britannia Carpets Stadium, Bargain Booze Stadium and its current name, The Help For Heroes Stadium.

Wincham Park's former name of The Bargain Booze Stadium was discussed on the popular BBC1 TV show Room 101 hosted by Frank Skinner.

Local rivals Northwich Victoria and Runcorn Linnets have ground-shared at Wincham Park. 1874 Northwich have also used the stadium to stage one-off matches.

Northwich Victoria and Witton Albion shared Wincham Park whilst both clubs played in the Evo-Stik League First Division North.

References

Football venues in England
Sports venues in Cheshire
Northwich
Sports venues completed in 1989